Governador Archer is a Brazilian municipality in the state of Maranhão. Its population is 10,886 (2020) and its total area is 446 km2.

References

Municipalities in Maranhão